General Telmo Oswaldo Vargas Benalcázar (9 October 1912  –  9 August 2013) was Chief of Staff of the Armed Forces of Ecuador, who overthrew the military junta of Ramón Castro Jijón on 29 March 1966. After Castro Jijón turned over power to army high command, the high command appointed Clemente Yerovi as president of the civilian junta. As the leader of the army high command, Vargas is considered by some to have briefly served as head of state of Ecuador. He died on 9 August 2013 at the age of 100.

References

Ecuadorian centenarians
Men centenarians
1912 births
2013 deaths
People from Quito Canton